Of Flight & Fury is the second full-length studio album by British chamber pop band The Miserable Rich. It saw the release of singles "Somerhill/Bye Bye Kitty," "Let Me Fade," and "Chestnut Sunday." "Pegasus" was used in 2009's Almost There: The Original Soundtrack.

Critical reception
Drowned in Sound wrote: "Whilst The Miserable Rich don't match the intense emotional peaks and troughs of the baroque ten-piece, they make up for it by subverting such exuberant instrumental craft with an understated humble charm."

Track listing

References

2010 albums
The Miserable Rich albums